Mark Smith is an American sound engineer who won an Oscar for Best Sound for the film The Last of the Mohicans. He worked on nearly 100 films and television shows from 1987 to 2006.

Selected filmography
 The Last of the Mohicans (1992)

References

External links

Year of birth missing (living people)
Living people
American audio engineers
Best Sound Mixing Academy Award winners